The 2021–22 Egyptian Second Division was the 42nd edition of the Egyptian Second Division, the top Egyptian semi-professional level for football clubs, since its establishment in 1977. The season started on 30 September 2021 and concluded on 4 June 2022. Fixtures for the 2021–22 season were announced on 12 September 2021.

Aswan, El Dakhleya and Haras El Hodoud won Group A, Group B and Group C respectively and secured the promotion to the 2022–23 Egyptian Premier League.

Format
The league consists of 48 teams divided into 3 groups of 16 teams each, with each group covering different parts of Egypt:
Group A for teams from Upper Egypt and eastern governorates.
Group B for teams from Greater Cairo, and central and north-eastern governorates.
Group C for teams from Alexandria and northern governorates.

The top team from each group earns promotion to the next season of the Egyptian Premier League, while the bottom 4 teams from each group get relegated to the Egyptian Third Division.

Teams
Team name followed with ↓ indicates the team was relegated from the 2020–21 Egyptian Premier League.
Team name followed with ↑ indicates the team was promoted from the 2020–21 Egyptian Third Division.

Group A
Al Aluminium
Aswan↓
Asyut Petroleum
Al Badari↑
Beni Suef
Dayrout
Faiyum
KIMA Aswan
Al Madina Al Monawara↑
Mallawi↑
Media
El Minya
MS Tamya↑
Qena
Sohag
Telephonat Beni Suef

Group B
Belbeis↑
Benha↑
El Dakhleya
El Entag El Harby↓
Al Merreikh
Al Nasr
Petrojet
Port Fouad↑
Porto Suez
El Qanah
El Sekka El Hadid
Suez
Telecom Egypt↑
Tersana
Wadi Degla↓
ZED

Group C
Abou Qir Fertilizers
Ala'ab Damanhour
Baladeyet El Mahalla
Dikernis
Al Hammam
Haras El Hodoud
Kafr El Sheikh
El Magd↑
El Mansoura
Al Masry (Al Saloum)↑
Olympic Club
Pioneers↑
El Raja
Said El Mahalla↑
Sporting Alexandria
Al Zarka

Results

Group A

Group B

Group C

Number of teams by governorate

References

Egyptian Second Division seasons
Egypt
Egyptian Second Division